The TP-82 was a triple-barrelled Soviet combination pistol carried by cosmonauts on space missions. It was intended as a survival aid to be used after landings and before recovery in the Siberian wilderness.

Features 
The pistol could be used for hunting, to defend against predators and for visible and audible distress signals. The detachable buttstock was also a machete that came with a canvas sheath. 

The upper two shotgun barrels used special 12.5×70 mm ammunition (40 gauge), and the lower single rifled barrel used 5.45×39mm ammunition developed for the AK-74 assault rifle. The TP-82 had a large lever on the left side of the receiver that opens the action, and a small grip safety under the trigger guard that resembled a secondary trigger. According to NASA astronauts, the gun was highly accurate.

History 
The TP-82 was the result of cosmonaut Alexei Leonov's concerns after being stranded in the Siberian wilderness when his Voskhod capsule malfunctioned. He feared that the 9mm Makarov pistol that was provided in his survival kit would be ineffective against the Siberian wildlife, namely bears and wolves.

TP-82s were carried regularly on Soviet and Russian space missions from 1986 to 2006. They were part of the Soyuz Portable Emergency Survival Kit (NAZ). 

In 2007, the media reported that the remaining ammunition for the TP-82 had become unusable and that a regular semi-automatic pistol would be used on future missions.

See also
M6 Aircrew Survival Weapon
M30 Luftwaffe Drilling

References

External links
 Russia has the corner on guns in space – MSNBC, Feb. 12, 2008
 TP-82 : Russian space pistol / shotgun / carbine / flare gun no longer being carried into space (with photos) – The Firearm Blog
 Soviet cosmonauts carried a shotgun into space
 The TOZ-81 'Mars' Gun Was The Soviet Union's Ultimate Space Revolver, including information on the TP-82

Double-barreled shotguns of the Soviet Union
Combination guns
Crewed space program of the Soviet Union
Survival guns
Alexei Leonov